Scott Parker (born 1980) is an English football manager and former footballer.

Scott Parker may also refer to:

Scott Parker (ice hockey) (born 1978), retired American ice hockey right winger
Scott Parker (motorcyclist) (born 1961), American motorcycle dirt track racer
Scott Parker (wrestler), one half of the professional wrestling tag team 3.0